Dula is a name. Notable people with the name include:

 Arthur M. Dula (born 1947) American lawyer and patent attorney
 Lishan Dula (born 1987), long-distance runner for Bahrain
 Louis Dula (born 1912), American Negro leagues baseball pitcher
 Tom Dula (1845–1868), Confederate soldier
 Vivalda Dula, Angolan singer-songwriter and percussionist
 Dula Bhaya Kag (1902–1977), Indian poet, songwriter, writer and artist
 Đula Mešter (born 1972), Serbian volleyball player of Hungarian ethnicity
 Ðula Sabo ( 1928), Yugoslav wrestler

See also
 Doula, an assistant providing non-medical support during and after childbirth
 Dulas (disambiguation)
 Dula-Horton Cemetery, historic cemetery in North Carolina